Destinies Fulfilled is a 1914 American silent short drama film directed by Lorimer Johnston. The film stars Charlotte Burton, Sydney Ayres, Jacques Jaccard, Violet Neitz, Joseph Knight, Louise Lester, Jack Richardson, Vivian Rich, and Harry Van Meter.

External links

1914 films
1914 drama films
Silent American drama films
American silent short films
American black-and-white films
1914 short films
Films directed by Lorimer Johnston
1910s American films